Last Train to Paris is a 2010 studio album by American rapper and record producer Diddy and American R&B and hip hop duo Dirty Money, billed collectively as "Diddy – Dirty Money". It was released on December 14, 2010, by Bad Boy Records and Interscope Records. It is the fifth album for Diddy as a solo artist, and the only album for Dirty Money (the duo disbanded in 2012). The album describes Diddy's alter-ego as he travels from London to Paris to regain his lost love. Last Train to Paris is predominantly  hip hop, but incorporates elements of Eurodance, Italo disco and tech house.

Guest vocalists on the album include Grace Jones, Chris Brown, Lil Wayne, Skylar Grey, Drake, Justin Timberlake, Nicki Minaj, T.I., Wiz Khalifa, Swizz Beatz, Trey Songz, Rick Ross, Usher, Sevyn Streeter, James Fauntleroy, Bilal and The Notorious B.I.G. The album also features vocal segues from designers and editors of the fashion world, including Vogue editor-in-chief Anna Wintour and Tommy Hilfiger. The executive producers on the album are Rodney Jerkins, Diddy, Mario Winans and Herve Pierre.

The album marks Diddy's debut with Interscope Records, after he moved his label (Bad Boy) from Atlantic Records in 2009. Last Train to Paris was generally well received by critics who praised the addition of Richard and Harper to help Diddy innovate a new sound.

The album was preceded by the release of four singles: "Angels", "Hello Good Morning", "Loving You No More" and "Coming Home", which received mixed success on the Billboard Hot 100. "Coming Home" was the most successful of the singles, peaking at number 12 on the United States. During its opening week Last Train to Paris outperformed expectations, debuting eight places higher than predicted at number 7 on the US Billboard 200. It sold 101,000 copies, compared to the 60,000-70,000 copies that Billboard had predicted it would sell.

Conception 
Diddy described Last Train to Paris as an "electro-hip-hop-soul funk" album which has been three years in the making. Diddy says the sound of this album was influenced by "being in the dance music world and doing stuff with Felix da Housecat, Erick Morillo, Deep Dish, DJ Hell and being in Ibiza and DC10." The arc follows Diddy's character as he tours from London to Paris and finds the woman of his dreams - only to lose her, find her, lose her again and find her a final time. The records were conceptualised from Diddy's comments to his producers. He told Alex da Kid (who produced "Coming Home") "I want a beat that makes me feel like a white man in a basement in Atlanta." Diddy said that "most of the producers he worked with, he's been friends with for a long time. The records came together by hanging out with them, taking them to parties and showing them movies".

In an interview with MTV News, Diddy said "One of the things [Dirty Money] trying to represent is emotion... Not being afraid to show emotion on record. A lot of records out right now — no disrespect to them, but they're all surface. It's about what people have or a dance. All our records are gonna be about love, feelings and emotion. Last Train to Paris is a love story and the most vulnerable album I've ever been involved in. It's raw emotion — you get a feeling, a vibe." Diddy also released an application for the iPhone that integrates his social networking site and Twitter feed. A short film will also accompany the album. Rap producer Bangladesh, also confirmed that he would be producing for the album. According to New York magazine, the album was "assembled from 60 or so songs. The genesis of Last Train to Paris is full of odd stories involving our hero, ensconced in a darkened studio, barking batty ideas to his production team."

Dirty Money 
Last Train to Paris is officially credited to Diddy – Dirty Money. Dirty Money was formed when Diddy asked former Danity Kane member Dawn Richard, and singer-songwriter Kalenna Harper to perform alongside him on the album. In an interview with All Hip-Hop, Diddy said that Dirty Money is "not about no drug money, illegal money, or anything negative". Instead he described it as "a sound, a movement, [and] a crew", something fresh and unique for his new album. He explained that "he wanted to tell a love story" but needed Dirty Money because "he couldn’t just tell the male’s point of view." Further elaborating on the group's name, Diddy told Slant Magazine that its origins are dated back to 2005 when the group was at "a strip club in Jacksonville, Florida, during the Super Bowl. People heard I was there, and all of a sudden so many people came in that I had to rush outside to my truck. I was sitting there with a bunch of money and I was like, 'Damn, this is some dirty money.' A light bulb went off that day." Simon Vozick-Levinson from Entertainment Weekly described the group's role on the album as "fleshing out Last Trains skeletal storyline, playing jealous lovers, disappointed partners, and commanding divas to his conflicted playboy." Jim Farber of New York Daily News said that Dirty Money "sing loudly, often and well -- a good thing", on the disk.  Henry Yanney of Soulculture said that Last Train to Paris was vocally-led Harper and Richard, who give the album "attitude and style". He said "the duo sing harmoniously and break into solos with much precision and pace, remaining in sync at all times with the abrasive club influenced beats on hand." David Jeffries said that at times Dirty Money came off as "fine background singers or part of Diddy’s Fashion Week posse." Matt Sayles disagreed, stating that on the record, "Diddy takes a backseat" which allowed "Kaleena and Dawn to do a lot of the heavy lifting (and breathing) on a wide range of songs." Dirty Money was inspired by the 1980s bands Soul II Soul and Loose Ends though Diddy pointed out that he "wanted to flip things" by having two girls and one guy in the band. "Two bad divas, one for the left and one for the right side of me". He told Amos Barshad from New York that "[The girls in Dirty Money] diamonds in the rough. These girls got a certain flavor and swagger, which is rare in this marketplace."

Album cover 
The album cover is a photograph at Centre Georges Pompidou (Paris, France) taken by Australian cricket writer and photographer Jarrod "Jrod" Kimber.

Guest vocals 
Guests included on the album were initially confirmed as Justin Timberlake, Chris Brown, Drake, Lil Wayne, Rick Ross, T.I., Swizz Beatz, Grace Jones, Bilal and Wiz Khalifa but the final track list also included Skylar Grey. Richard told MTV News that the album had been in the making before she and Harper joined Diddy to form Dirty Money. She said "I know when Kalenna and I speak, we sometimes feel giddy because people like pioneers of the game said, 'You know what? We want to be on your album,'". Richard also defended the number of guests on the album stating that it was a "labor of love" which is why the group felt like the album needed a "stunning introduction" to the world. Simon Vozick-Levinson of Entertainment Weekly said the role of the guests on the album "[mainly] assorted suave fellows... help fill out [Diddy]'s side of the conversation." Vogue was first to reveal that editors and fashion designers have recorded vocal segues for the album. Among those set to feature on the album are Isaac Mizrahi, André Leon Talley, Zac Posen, Marc Jacobs, Anna Wintour (editor in chief at Vogue) and Tommy Hilfiger. Talley said of his involved in the album, "[Diddy]'s like great creative thinkers in music who love fashion; swooner Marvin Gaye in his duets with Tammi Terrell comes to mind   —   what sense of elegance, what Motown glamour!"

Promotion 
On November 21, 2010, Diddy-Dirty Money appeared at the American Music Awards (2010) where they performed "Coming Home".
On December 5, 2010, Diddy released The Prelude - Last Train to Paris, a free mixtape of seven songs from the upcoming album exclusively through Vogue.com. Later that same day, the group appeared on Saturday Night Live to promote the Last Train to Paris. They performed "Coming Home" and "Ass on the Floor" with Swizz Beatz. A preluding mixtape, was released exclusively to Vogue magazine on December 3, 2010. On December 13, 2010, the album was made available to stream online through Myspace.  On December 18, 2010, the group performed at the third annual WWE Tribute to the Troops concert. On the chart dated December 25, 2010, "Someone to Love Me" debuted on the U.S. Bubbling Under R&B/Hip-Hop Singles chart at number fifteen. On January 4, 2010, Angie Martinez premiered a new remix of "Someone to Love Me" on her official website. Titled "The MJB Naked Mix", the new version features Blige and Lil Wayne. Lil Wayne's verse consists of sixteen bars, and a reference to 1994 Mary J. Blige song "My Life". Additionally, the group released another mixtape in time for Valentine's Day 2011. LoveLove Vs. HateLove features at least four songs from the Last Train to Paris recording sessions plus other songs.

Coming Home tour 
Rap-Up initially reported that Diddy-Dirty Money would be touring in support of the album. The Last Train to Paris world tour kicked off in March 2011. However, when the tour dates were revealed, the tour was actually renamed to The Coming Home Tour. The show kicked off on April 13, 2011, in Minneapolis, running for twenty-one dates before ending in St. Louis on May 15, 2011. Lloyd and Tyga served as the tour's opening acts.

Singles 
"Angels", featuring The Notorious B.I.G. and Rick Ross, was released as the first single, followed by promo single "Love Come Down" (which does not appear on the final track listing); both were released on November 3, 2009. Both tracks, which sample songs by Jay-Z, were not considered successful. The album's second single, "Hello Good Morning" features T.I., was released on March 30, 2010, and spawned several official remixes including versions featuring Rick Ross & Nicki Minaj, Tinchy Stryder & Tinie Tempah (UK Remix), Rick Ross & T.I. and a Grime mix with Skepta. The single peaked at number thirteen on the US Hot R&B/Hip-Hop Songs chart, number twenty-seven on the US Billboard Hot 100 and number fifty in Canada. "Loving You No More", featuring Drake, was released as the album's third single on September 21, 2010. It was not as successful as its predecessor, only managing to peak at thirty-five on Hot R&B/Hip Hop Songs chart and number ninety-one on the Hot 100. Soon after, the Alex da Kid and Jay-Z produced "Coming Home" was announced as the lead single and overall fourth single, released on November 21, 2010. It features additional vocals from Kid's protégé Skylar Grey. It was the album's most successful single, peaking at number eleven on the Billboard Hot 100.

According to an official press release from Bad Boy Records, the Usher-assisted "Looking for Love" will be the next single. Despite this confirmation, "Your Love" featuring Trey Songz (with Rick Ross including a verse in the remix) was sent to Rhythmic radio on March 15, 2011, confirming it as the fifth single from the album. It has charted at #41 on the U.S. Billboard R&B chart. The album's sixth single is "Ass on the Floor", featuring Swizz Beatz, released to the United Kingdom. It debuted on the Bubbling Under Hot R&B/Hip-Hop Songs at number five, before making its full Hot R&B/Hip-Hop Songs chart debut at number eighty-eight the following week.

Other songs 
Promo single "Love Come Down" received a music video, premiering on November 12, 2009. The vintage club TV style video sees "Diddy and the group set the tone with an all-black motif, dressing in black and performing on a black stage — except for the occasional flash of Diddy's gold teeth. Toward the end, the trio change to all-white outfits before going back to black." A separate music video was filmed for a remix for "Angels", featuring Rick Ross instead of The Notorious B.I.G., premiered on March 2, 2010, with Parris serving as the director. The video also features cameos by Busta Rhymes and DJ Khaled. Hype Williams also directed the music videos for the album's third single "Hello Good Morning", featuring T.I., which premiered in May 2010. Two alternate videos were filmed for the song's remixes; one featuring the remix that includes Rick Ross, and another for the remix that retains Rick Ross, excludes T.I. and includes Nicki Minaj.

Additionally, on November 29, 2010 "Ass on the Floor", featuring Swizz Beatz (which was released as the album's sixth single months later) was released as a free download through Beatz' Monster Mondays initiative and the video for the song was released on December 13, 2010. The video was directed by Colin Tilley. This was followed by a video for "Someone to Love Me" on December 10, 2010, which was actually shot over one year earlier, on September 29, 2009, by Nabil. A video for the remix was booked on February 9, 2011, with Colin Tilley, meanwhile a simple video for "I Hate That You Love Me" premiered on February 6, 2011. On January 21, 2011, Diddy-Dirty Money filmed a music video for "Yesterday" with Chris Brown. Tilley has also directed the video for an amended version "Your Love" which features Trey Songz and Rick Ross, which was released on March 30, 2011.

Commercial performance 
In its opening week, the Last Train to Paris debuted on the US Billboard 200 at number 7, with 101,000 copies sold. The final figure sold was, in Billboards own words, "rather larger than initial forecasts", which put the album at around number 15, with 60,000 - 70,000 copies. Despite beating the expectations, the Last Train to Paris underperformed against Diddy's previous album, Press Play (2006), which debuted at number one, with 170,000 copies sold. Thus far, it is Diddy's lowest charting album on this chart as well as Dawn Richard's lowest charting Billboard 200 album, the others being with the group Danity Kane. The album also debuted on the US Top Digital Albums at number 7 and the US R&B/Hip-Hop Albums at number 3. It is also both Diddy's and Richard's lowest charting R&B/Hip-Hop album, thus far. Last Train to Paris is Kalenna Harper's first appearance on any Billboard album chart. , the album has sold around 270,000 copies in the United States.

Critical reception 

Upon its release, Last Train to Paris received positive reviews from most music critics. At Metacritic, which assigns a normalized rating out of 100 to reviews from mainstream critics, the album received an average score of 75, based on 13 reviews, which indicates "generally favorable reviews". Simon Vozick-Levinson from Entertainment Weekly said "Last Train to Pariss glittery grooves feel authentically his own." He called Last Train a throwback to Diddy's 2007 hit single "Last Night". It's the "electro-laced torch duet blown out to full album length". He concluded by saying "the sheer number of cameos overwhelms the narrative conceit after a while... But who really cares? By that time, you just might be enjoying yourself way too much to notice." Jim Farber of New York Daily News was impressed with Dirty Money's contribution to the album. He said "their input gives the CD a cohesion otherwise disrupted by Diddy's usual conga line of guest stars." He pointed out that the album takes on a Eurodance sound and although people might see it as "leaping on that bandwagon but as it turns out, the milieu proves a much better fit for his, er, talents, than any CD he has released so far." Farber concluded by saying "The Euro edge gives the music a leg up on the more conservative (read: American) dance music favored by the most mainstream club act of now -- those ever mushy Peas." Andy Gill of The Independent noted Dirty Money's "emphasis on emotion over purely dance imperatives" and dubbed the album "easily the best work Diddy's been involved with in his entire career." Caroline Sullivan of The Guardian gave it three out of five stars and stated, "The album is a mess, but a hook-heavy, likable one."

David Jeffries from AllMusic noted Diddy's "unfiltered self" and "unique attitude", stating "This hook-filled, vibrant effort is that rare heartbreak album that can speak on a lovelorn level and then put a little strut back in your step." Matt Sayles from The Boston Globe complimented its concept and praised the mixture of R&B vocals from Dirty Money and the guest features from the range of A-list friends, particularly Grace Jones stating that "There’s no telling why she turns up but she sounds right at home on the thumping club anthem. [Grace's] cameo is just one more pleasant surprise on an album full of them." Brandon Soderberg from The Village Voice was also impressed with the artistic creation. He said "Once you hear Pariss mish-mash (Diddy’s word) of sounds, all that producer-genius experimentalism makes some sense. Every song is full of swift change-ups and jarring musical detours; Diddy often interrupts these jagged dance tracks to emote... It's lots of fun, and though confessional in parts, it's overall far from the self-serious, petulant complaint-raps of say, Drake or Kanye. Paris looks back to dance music as soulful catharsis and emotionalism, not the cold thump that’s taken over as of late." Nitsuh Abebe from New York magazine said "Last Train to Paris is one of the first records that's really made me feel like [Diddy] sounds clever. [However he] makes what seems to me to be an aesthetic error, which is that if you want to put sleek, rainy-sounding synths everywhere ... [But] this album hits its mood right, though — gray skies, Eurorail, and drama — it's excellent stuff. The hectic format fades away, and the music actually becomes the hypnotic cruise it aspires to be."

Track listing

Notes 
 denotes vocal producer.
 denotes co-producer
"Someone to Love Me" contains a sample of "You Roam When You Don't Get It At Home" performed by The Sweet Inspirations, written by Bettye Crutcher, David Porter and Ronnie Williams.
"Angels" contains elements of "My Downfall" written by Sean Combs, Christopher Wallace, Darryl McDaniels, Nashiem Myrick and Carlos Broady, and elements and samples of "Where I'm From" written by Deric Angelletie, Ronald Lawrence, Shawn Carter and Norman Whitfield, and performed by Jay-Z.

Versions 
On Japanese edition, it features the same track listing as the deluxe edition, that was released in other markets, but in a different order.
Both "Clean" and "Explicit" versions of the album were released. On "Clean Versions" track two is called "A** on the Floor".
On the deluxe edition of the album, it features "Last Night (Part 2)" as track 15, and "Change" as track 17. Tracks 14 and 15 from the standard edition, respectively appeared as tracks 12 and 18 on the deluxe edition.
On the iTunes Store digital deluxe edition, it has an additional bonus track, "First Place Loser".

Personnel 
Adapted from Allmusic.

Main vocals

Sean "Diddy" Combs

Dirty Money – Kalenna Harper, Dawn Richard

Guest Vocals

Swizz Beatz
The Notorious B.I.G.
Lil Wayne
Chris Brown
Drake
T.I.
Sevyn (formerly of Richgirl)
James Fauntleroy
Skylar Grey
Grace Jones
Wiz Khalifa
Bilal
Rick Ross
Trey Songz
Justin Timberlake
Usher

Technicians and musicians

 The Monsters & The Strangerz – audio engineer
Brian "Fluff" Allison – mixing assistant
Arden "Keyz" Altino – producer
Marcella "Ms. Lago" Araica – engineer
Justin Batad – mixing assistant
Smith Carlson – assistant engineer
Matt Champlain – assistant engineer
Capricorn Clark – creative director
Sean Combs – producer
LaShawn Daniels – background vocals
Danja – instrumentation, producer (tracks 2, 7, 13)
Tony Dawsey – mastering
Deekay – producer
Ben Defusco – guitar
Dernst "D.Mile" Emile – guitar, keyboards, producer (track 9)
Dirty Money – vocals
Mike "Handz" Donaldson – engineer
Jerry "Wonda" Duplessis – composer, producer (track 6)
James Fauntleroy – background vocals
Paul Foley – engineer
Brian "Big Bass" Gardener – mastering
Guy Gerber – instrumentation, producer (track 1)
Jesus Granica – mixing assistant
Zach Gurka – engineer
DJ Leon Higgins – cut
Nathaniel Hills – composer
William Smith – composer, producer (track 1, 4, 5)
Jai Manselle – creative consultant
Merrell Hollis – make-up
Hollywood Hotsauce – producer (track 14)
Stephanie Hsu – art direction
Eric Hudson – keyboards
Justin Hylton-Williams – composer, vocals
James 'J Lack' Lackey – producer (track 5)
Jay-Z – producer (track 15)
Jaycen Joshua – mixing
Rodney Jerkins – associate executive producer, musician, producer (track 3)
David "J-Maul" Johnson – keyboards
Stefan Johnson – engineer
Tyrone Johnson – keyboard arrangements
Jamal "Polow Da Don" Jones – producer
Sly Jordan – vocal producer
Nicholson Joseph Jr. – assistant engineer
Chris Kasych – assistant engineer, mixing assistant
Alex da Kid – producer (track 15)
LaShawn "The Big Shiz" Daniels – vocal producer
Latoya Duggan – background vocals
Giancarlo Lino – mixing assistant
Rico Love – vocals
Erik Madrid – mixing assistant
Henri-David "HD" Magloire – mixing assistant
Fabian Marasciullo – mixing
Manny Marroquin – mixing
Mylah Morales – make-up
Jared Newcomb – assistant engineer
Chris "Tek" O'Ryan – engineer
Derek Roche – stylist
Lucia Rodriguez – make-up
Justin Sampson – assistant engineer, mixing assistant
Edward Sanders – assistant engineer
Marni Senofonte – stylist
7 Aurelius – producer (track 12)
Travis Shinn – photography
Larry Sims – hair stylist
Curtis Smith – hair stylist
Brian Springer – engineer
Steve 'Rock Star' Dickey – engineer, mixing
Jeremy Stevenson – engineer, mixing
Steve Styles – bass
Swizz Beatz – producer
Dalya Taman – art direction
Matt Testa – A&R
Matthew Testa – engineer, mixing
Sergio "Sergical" Tsai – engineer, mixing
Kyle Cabrol – digital marketing intern
Andrew Van Meter – producer
Cassie Ventura – background vocals
Pat Viala – engineer
Billy Villane – mixing assistant
Jeffrey "J-Dub" Walker – keyboards
Miles Walker – mixing
Nolan Wescott – mixing assistant
Kevin Wilson – engineer, mixing assistant
Mario Winans – executive producer, keyboards, producer (track 16)

Charts

Weekly charts

Year-end charts

Release history

References

External links 
 Last Train to Paris at Metacritic

2010 debut albums
Sean Combs albums
Bad Boy Records albums
Interscope Records albums
Albums produced by Danja (record producer)
Albums produced by Alex da Kid
Albums produced by Swizz Beatz
Concept albums
Albums produced by Rodney Jerkins